Stephen Avenue is a major pedestrian mall in downtown Calgary, Alberta, Canada. The mall is the portion of 8 Avenue SW between 4 Street SW and 1 Street SE. It is open to vehicles only from 6:00 p.m. to 6:00 a.m.

The street is known for some of Calgary's finest restaurants, cafés, pubs and bars. The street also provides an eclectic mix of boutiques and high-end retail.  Major shopping centres include The Core Shopping Centre, (formerly Calgary Eaton Centre/TD Square), Bankers Hall, Fashion Central, Scotia Centre, and The Bay department store.

The street is also home to downtown Calgary's major convention and exhibition facility, the Telus Convention Centre, and two hotels, the Hyatt Regency Calgary, which incorporates several historic buildings into its facade, and the Calgary Marriott.

History

The street was named after George Stephen, 1st Baron Mount Stephen, the first president of the Canadian Pacific Railway. Stephen Avenue contains a high concentration of registered historic buildings and the street itself was declared a Canadian historic site in 2002. Many of these building are made of sandstone that was quarried locally from the Paskapoo Formation; a result of the construction of fire-resistant buildings following a fire in 1886 that damaged many of the city's earlier wooden structures.

References

External links

Neighbourhoods in Calgary
Historic districts in Canada
Shopping districts and streets in Canada
National Historic Sites in Alberta
Pedestrian malls in Canada
Roads in Calgary
Tourist attractions in Calgary